Josephine Starrs (born 1955) is an Australian artist who creates socially engaged art focusing on human relationships to new technologies, nature and climate change. Her video and new media work has been exhibited in Australia and at international art exhibitions. She was a Senior Lecturer in Media Arts at Sydney College of the Arts, University of Sydney until 2016.

Background and education 
Starrs grew up in Adelaide, South Australia and was educated at the South Australian School of Arts. She has worked in a variety of mediums including photography, animation, video, and new media. She is a founding member of the cyberfeminist group VNS Matrix.

Collaboration with Leon Cmielewski 
Starrs has collaborated with artist Leon Cmielewski since 1994 when they were living together in New York. Their collaborative work focuses on incorporating interactivity and play while engaging with contemporary social issues. Their works have appeared in forms such as kiosks, games, card games, dances, films, and mapping installations.

Selected works
The works below are in collaboration with Leon Cmielewski unless otherwise noted. 
 User Unfriendly Interface (1996), first shown at Performance Space, Sydney.
 Fuzzy Love Dating Database (1997), first exhibited at the Künstlerhaus Bethanien in Berlin.
 Dream Kitchen (2000)
 Trace (2002), commissioned and exhibited by State Records Centre, Sydney. 
 Floating Territories (2004), which took place in the form of swipe cards as boarding passes for a ferry that traveled between Helsinki, Finland, Stockholm, Sweden, and Tallinn, Estonia. Travellers were assigned tribal allegiances that each had different goals in the game based on locations on the ferry.
 Seeker (2006), which was a map-based game that allowed viewers to track their family migration history and view statistics about natural resources, migration flows, human population, and economics in a visual format. Seeker won an Award of Distinction at the Ars Electronica festival in Linz, Austria in 2007. 
 sms_origins (2009), displayed at Federation Square in Melbourne, Australia. sms_origins was an adaptation of Seeker for mobile phones.  
 Downstream (2009), exhibited by Novamedia at the "Impact by Degrees" exhibition in Washington, D.C. This work included a large print work called And The River Was Dust, based on text from the poem South of my Days by Australian poet Judith Wright. 
 Incompatible Elements (2010), exhibited at Performance Space Carriageworks, Sydney. 
 Dancing with Drones (2015), in collaboration with dancer Alison Plevey in the form of a film of a dance competition between a human dancer and a remotely operated drone.
 and the earth sighed (2016), featured in Performing Climates, Arts House, Melbourne video documentation.

References

External links
 http://josephinestarrs.com

New media artists
Living people
1955 births
20th-century Australian women artists
20th-century Australian artists
21st-century Australian women artists
21st-century Australian artists